The President's Mistress is a 1978 American made-for-television drama mystery film produced by Kings Road Entertainment and starring Beau Bridges, Karen Grassle, Susan Blanchard and Larry Hagman.

Plot
Donna Morton has been having an affair with the President of the United States for several months, regularly meeting with him for assignations in a safe house in Washington, D.C. She is always picked up in a car by a Secret Service agent.

In Moscow, a US agent in the Kremlin manages to get hold of a secret document identifying Donna Morton as a KGB agent sent to spy on the president. This document is passed back to Washington, where it comes into the possession of the CSA (a thinly disguised version of the CIA). They begin to put Donna Morton under surveillance.

The same day, her brother Ben Morton – a Washington businessman and occasional courier for the CSA – arrives back in the city. On the plane, he meets and romances Mugsy Evans. When Donna Morton is found dead in her apartment moments before she was due to be picked up by her Secret Service driver, he begins to investigate.

He discovers her affair with the president, and through his contacts with the Secret Service, he discovers a CSA agent was seen leaving her apartment building around the time of her death. The Secret Service agent who regularly drove Donna informs him that the CSA were there, but before any more information can be passed on, she is killed.

Realising now that the CSA had played a large role in her death, Ben Morton confronts the head of the CSA, who tells him it was the Soviets who killed her, and that she was a Soviet agent. He explains that the man who probably performed the deed was the head KGB agent in Washington, Anatoly.

Anatoly is the Soviet Naval Attaché whom he interrogates at gunpoint in the car. He tells him everything he knows – that the classified document identifying Donna Morton as a Soviet agent was a fake, designed to throw the CSA off balance, and had been intended to fall into American hands. The KGB had thus hoped to destabilise the White House during crucial talks with China.

Cast
 Beau Bridges - Ben Morton
 Karen Grassle - Donna Morton
 Larry Hagman - Ed Murphy
 Joel Fabiani - Jim Gilkrest
 Susan Blanchard - Margaret 'Mugsy' Evans

References

1978 television films
1978 films
1970s mystery drama films
American mystery drama films
American television films
1970s English-language films
Films set in Washington, D.C.
Films scored by Lalo Schifrin
Films directed by John Llewellyn Moxey
1970s American films